Darbinyan or Darbinian,, is an Armenian surname. Its meaning is equivalent to Smith. Darbinyan is the Eastern Armenian form of the name, the Western Armenian variant being Tarpinian. Notable people with the surname include:

Armen Darbinyan (born 1965), Armenian politician and Prime Minister of Armenia
Samvel Darbinyan, Armenian football manager
Jeff Tarpinian, American football player with the New England Patriots
Ruben Darbinyan (1883-1968), Armenian politician, Justice minister, political activist, author and editor

Armenian-language surnames